Kandrakota is a village in East Godavari District of the Indian state of Andhra Pradesh. It is located in Peddapuram mandal of Peddapuram revenue division.

Demographics 
Population data of Kandrakota Village at the 2001 census:

References 

Villages in East Godavari district